The Mandi language, Nomaande (or Lemande), is a Southern Bantoid language of Cameroon.

References

Mbam languages
Languages of Cameroon